Elizabeth Sarancheva also known as Elizabeth Tereshchenko was the daughter of Lieutenant general Mikhail Andreyevich Saranchev, Ivan Tereshchenko's wife and mother of Mikhail Tereshchenko. She was also a philanthropist as a member of the Tereshchenko dynasty's women, and a meconate.

Biography
Sarancheva was the official owner of the Villa Mariposa in Cannes, and the yacht "Iolanda". Sarancheva spent most of her life living in Paris. She died in 1923 and was buried in the church of Beaulieu-sur-Mer.

World War I and Russian Revolution
Sarancheva continued donating all the available funds of the family to the repair and needs of Russian Orthodox churches in Cannes and Beaulieu-sur-Mer, following the last will of her husband Ivan.

Personal life
Married to Ivan Tereshchenko.

Charity activities
Active donations to the Russian Orthodox churches for the needs of repairing and restorations. Elizabeth and her husband were supporters and funders of the St Volodymyr's Cathedral.

References

External links
http://spartacus-educational.com/RUS-Mikhail_Tereshchenko.htm
https://www.m-a-k.net/iolanda.htm

1860 births
1923 deaths
Tereshchenko family